Tridentella is a genus of crustaceans belonging to the monotypic family Tridentellidae.

The species of this genus are found in America, Malesia, Australia.

Species

The genus contains the following species:

Tridentella acheronae 
Tridentella benguela 
Tridentella brandtae 
Tridentella cornuta 
Tridentella glutacantha 
Tridentella japonica 
Tridentella katlae 
Tridentella laevicephalax 
Tridentella magna 
Tridentella memikat 
Tridentella namibia 
Tridentella ornamenta 
Tridentella ornata 
Tridentella palmata 
Tridentella quinicornis 
Tridentella recava 
Tridentella rosemariae 
Tridentella saxicola 
Tridentella sculpturata 
Tridentella tangaroae 
Tridentella tanimbar 
Tridentella virginiana 
Tridentella vitae

References

Isopoda